Derek Blighe (born 1980) is an Irish far-right anti-immigration political activist. A construction worker by trade, Blighe immigrated to Canada during the Post-2008 Irish economic downturn. Following his return to Ireland in 2019, Blighe became politically active during the 2022–2023 Irish anti-immigration protests, in which he became active as a self-described "citizen journalist". This involved him attending, filming and promoting anti-immigration protests across Ireland. As part of this activism, Blighe has promoted the great replacement conspiracy theory as explaining the basis for immigration into Ireland. In 2023, he became the leader of a registered political party "Ireland First", with anti-immigration as the main plank of its platform.

Background
Blighe was born in 1980 in Rylane, a small village 40 minutes north-west of Cork City by car. His father, Denis Blighe, was a trade unionist and supporter of the socialist politician Joe Sherlock, a member of the Workers' Party and later the Democratic Left.  In 2001 Denis Blighe was active in defending refugees from criticism; he wrote a number of letters to the Irish Examiner expressing the view that refugees were "working in non-union jobs, are being exploited by low wages" and "Refugees find it difficult to find accommodation. People tell them to come and see the property and say they will call them back, but the phone never rings. Some landlords seem to have a problem with them".

After leaving secondary school, Blighe became a bricklayer. Following the collapse of the Celtic Tiger in the late 2000s, Blighe immigrated to Calgary in Alberta, Canada.

Activism
Following his return to Ireland in 2019, Blighe became active online and began professing conspiratorial views, such as endorsing the conspiracy that a "Great replacement" is occurring in Ireland. Blighe suggested that the government is purposefully replacing native Irish people with immigrants from Africa and the Middle East.

Blighe became politically active in the spring of 2022, filming videos initially with an anti-lockdown focus before pivoting to anti-immigration as his main topic; targeting the arrival of Ukrainian refugees fleeing the Russian invasion of Ukraine. These videos soon brought him into contact with members of the Irish far-right, such as former National Party member Philip Dwyer. In August 2022, Blighe was amongst a number of protesters who taunted and jeered the Taoiseach Micheál Martin and Tanaiste Leo Varadkar during their commemoration of Michael Collins at Béal na Bláth.

In the latter half of 2022, Blighe attended and lead anti-immigration protests in counties Dublin, Wicklow, Kerry, Waterford, and Cork. During this time period, he also began assembling an organisation known as "Ireland First", which organised through secret Telegram groups. Both the Irish Times and the Guardian have described Blighe using the Ireland First telegram channel to radicalise his supporters with extremist language. The Phoenix has reported that in 2022 Bligh shared a number of messages from British Neo-Nazi Mark Collett to the Ireland First Telegram channel. In early 2023, the Ireland First group officially registered as a political party with Oireachtas Registrar of Political Parties, with an official website promoting Blighe as their leader.

Views
Blighe has stated Ireland is being "assaulted" by "unvettable fake refugees". He has referred to immigration as a "plantation" (in reference to the Plantation of Ulster), and linked migration to rape and violence. Blighe has spread false claims that children would be sharing buildings with refugees, something the Department of Integration later clarified was categorically false.

Legal issues
Blighe was brought to court and charged with theft after he filmed himself in September 2022 taking clothes from a shelter for Ukrainian refugees.

Personal life
While living in Canada, Blighe met and married a Canadian woman. She immigrated to Ireland with him and his children in 2019.

External links
 Ireland First

References

1980 births
Living people
People from County Cork
Irish far-right politicians